Laura Smyth is an English comedian and writer notable for winning the Funny Women award in 2019.

Life 
Smyth was brought up in East London. She was an English teacher. She entered the Funny Women awards and after proceeding through the heats she won the main stage award in 2019. This was the same award as Thanyia Moore had won the year before.

She appeared on Jonathan Ross' Comedy Club on ITV in the second episode and she was invited to Alan Davies: As Yet Untitled where she joined Alan Davies, Tez Ilyas, Sara Pascoe and Ade Edmondson for a chat.

In 2022 it was announced that the BBC comedy Bad Education was to return for a new series with Jack Whitehall as executive producer and in the first episode. The "breakthrough" writing team included Nathan Bryon, Smyth, Leila Navabi, Priya Hall and Ciaran Bartlett.

Private life
She has three children.

References 

English women comedians
21st-century English comedians
Year of birth missing (living people)
Living people
Comedians from London